Kurdiumivka is an urban-type settlement in Bakhmut Raion of Donetsk Oblast in eastern Ukraine, at 54.7 km NNE from the centre of Donetsk city. Population:

History

War in Donbas
The war in Donbass, that started in mid-April 2014, has brought along both civilian and military casualties. A civilian was killed by shelling in Kurdiumivka on 6 February 2017.

2022 Russian invasion of Ukraine
According to information provided by the Russian war correspondent Vladlen Tatarsky, Kurdiumivka was taken over by Russian Armed Forces on 29th November 2022. The ISW assessed that Ukrainian forces launched a counter attack on the 29th of December, 2022, and regained positions inside Kurdiumivka, but this has not yet been confirmed by the General Staff of the Armed Forces of Ukraine.

Demographics
In 2001 the settlement had 1161 inhabitants. Native language as of the Ukrainian Census of 2001:
Ukrainian — 51.25%
Russian 48.49%

References

Urban-type settlements in Bakhmut Raion